Strahinja Macanović (born 14 March 1997) is a Serbian football midfielder who plays for Bosnian side Jedinstvo Brčko.

Career

Early career
Born in Sombor, Macanović started his career with local club Radnički. Playing with youth categories of the club, Macanović was called into Serbia u17 team in 2012 by coach Branislav Nikolić, as the first player of Radnički Sombor who was a member of any national team level after ten years. He joined the first-team in the ending of the 2012–13 Serbian League Vojvodina season and made his senior debut for the club at the age of 16, during the district cup match against Tekstilac Odžaci. Later, Macanović joined FK Vojvodina as a cadet, and stayed the club until summer 2016, when he overgrown youth selection and terminated scholarship contract with club.

OFK Bačka
In summer 2016, Macanović joined a new SuperLiga club OFK Bačka, and his first one-year professional contract. Macanović scored his first senior goal in sixth fixture of the 2016–17 Serbian SuperLiga season in away match against Rad. As the coincidence, he also scored his second season goal against the same rival in 21 fixture match, played on 14 December 2016 at the Slavko Maletin Vava Stadium, when he was nominated for the man of the match. For the half-season playing as a senior, Macanović made 9 league and 1 cup match against Spartak Subotica, scoring two goals.

Career statistics

References

External links
 
 
 Strahinja Macanović at Srbijafudbal

1997 births
Living people
Sportspeople from Sombor
Association football midfielders
Serbian footballers
Serbian expatriate footballers
FK Radnički Sombor players
FK Vojvodina players
OFK Bačka players
FK Radnik Bijeljina players
Serbian SuperLiga players
First League of the Republika Srpska players
Serbian expatriate sportspeople in Bosnia and Herzegovina
Expatriate footballers in Bosnia and Herzegovina